Eisbären Berlin (English: Berlin Polar Bears) is a professional ice hockey team based in Berlin, Germany. The team competes in the Deutsche Eishockey Liga (DEL), the highest level of play in professional German ice hockey, and is also one of the league's founding members. The Eisbären have won the DEL championship more often than any other team, with eight DEL championships as of the 2020–21 season. They won the German ice hockey cup in 2008 as well as the European Trophy in 2010. Before reunification the team won the East German ice hockey championship 15 times as SC Dynamo Berlin.

The club's origins go back to 1954. It was the ice hockey department of sports club SC Dynamo Berlin. Following incorporation into the West German 1. Bundesliga in 1990, the ice hockey department became the independent ice hockey club EHC Dynamo Berlin, and then in 1992 renamed EHC Eisbären Berlin. The home games are played at the Mercedes-Benz Arena.

The Eisbären Berlin are owned by the Anschutz Entertainment Group. The official logo of the team is the polar bear, a reference to the bear appearing on Berlin's coat of arms.

History

1954–1994: GDR and 1. Bundesliga years

The sports club SC Dynamo Berlin was part of the SV Dynamo sports association. The SV Dynamo was the nationwide sports association of the Stasi, Volkspolizei, and customs. The sports club offered a wide spectrum of competitive athletic activities, including track and field, football, swimming, gymnastics, fencing, rowing, boxing and ice skating. SC Dynamo Berlin created an ice hockey section in 1954. The hockey section had originally begun as an ice hockey section of the SV Deutsche Volkspolizei Berlin sports community in 1950.

SC Dynamo Berlin trained and played its matches in the large Werner-Seelenbinder-Halle in Prenzlauer Berg during its first years. The team won their first East German title in 1966. The league was reduced to just two teams, SC Dynamo Berlin and SG Dynamo Weißwasser, in 1971, which made up the smallest ice hockey league in the world. Altogether, SC Dynamo Berlin won the East German championship 15 times, the last title coming in 1988. In 1984, SC Dynamo Berlin competed at the European Cup of Champions and came in third place.

In 1990, the year of German reunification, both former East German ice hockey clubs, SC Dynamo Berlin and SG Dynamo Weißwasser, which had been renamed PEV Weißwasser, were assigned to the 1. Bundesliga, at the time the highest level of play in German ice hockey. The ice hockey department of SC Dynamo Berlin became independent ice hockey club EHC Dynamo Berlin in the same year. However, Berlin was unable to compete successfully and was consequently relegated to the lower 2. Bundesliga at the end of the season. The club was promoted back to the 1. Bundesliga following the 1991–92 season. It was known that the president of SV Dynamo and the head of the Stasi Erich Mielke had been a warm supporter of ice hockey. EHC Dynamo Berlin had been financed by the East German Ministry of the Interior until the end of 1990. The club tried to distance itself from its East German image, under the leadership of Günter Haake and manager Lorenz Funk. In 1992 the club was renamed again, this time to "EHC Eisbären Berlin" and also introduced the polar bear logo. However, due to severe financial difficulties, the club had to rely heavily on its junior and other low-tier players and thus regularly finished at the bottom of the standings and struggled to avoid relegation to the 2. Bundeliga.

1994–present: DEL years
The German Eishockey Bundesliga was abolished following the 1993–94 season and a new league – Deutsche Eishockey Liga (DEL) – was created. The Eisbären are one of the league's 18 founding members. Following the Bosman ruling of 1995, the club replaced almost the entire roster with veteran European players in 1996–97. The team finished the regular season in third place and reached the DEL play-offs for the first time. In 1997 the club was renamed EHC neue Eisbären Berlin gegr. 1997 e.V. The following season, 1997–98, the Eisbären advanced to the final round of the DEL play-offs and finished the season as runner up. The team also participated in the 1998 IIHF Continental Cup in Tampere, Finland, and finished in second place. In 1998–99, Eisbären participated in the European Hockey League and finished in third place.

The Anschutz Entertainment Group acquired sole ownership of the Eisbären in 1999, ensuring financial stability. The team finished in second place at the 2000 IIHF Continental Cup. In 2002–03 and 2003–04 the team finished the DEL regular season in first place, but fell short of capturing the title. At that time, the team had already become hugely popular, selling out 28 of 31 home games during the 2003–04 season In 2005–06 and 2006–07, the Eisbären were the German representative at the Spengler Cup in Davos, Switzerland.

In 2004–05, a season marked by the 2004–05 NHL lockout, saw the Eisbären capture their first DEL championship. With the help of NHL veterans such as Erik Cole, Nathan Dempsey, and Olaf Kölzig, Berlin beat Mannheim in three games. The title was defended successfully in 2006 against the DEG Metro Stars. Their third DEL championship was captured in 2008, when the Eisbären beat Kölner Haie in the final round of the play-offs. In 2008, the Eisbären hosted the NHL's Tampa Bay Lightning in a pre-season game, which the Lightning won 4:1. The fourth DEL title followed in 2009, when the DEG Metro Stars were beaten 3:1 in a best-of-five final play-off round. In 2010, the team won the European Trophy, continuing its success on an international scale. A fifth DEL title was won in 2011, when the Grizzly Adams Wolfsburg were swept in the final round of the play-offs. A sixth title was won in 2012, after a full length best-of-five final against Adler Mannheim, with a seventh coming the next year after a 3:1 series victory over Kölner Haie. With their 2013 title, the Eisbären Berlin had won 7 DEL titles, including three straight, making them the DEL championship record holder for several years; Adler Mannheim later tied the record in 2019.

In the 2016–17 league season, the Eisbären Berlin drew an average home attendance of 12,052.

Eisbären ultimately won their eighth DEL championship in 2021, defeating Grizzlys Wolfsburg 2:1 in a best-of-three, and in the process reclaiming the record for most DEL championships.

Home arena

SC Dynamo Berlin played its home matches in the Werner-Seelenbinder-Halle in Prenzlauer Berg during the first years. The team then moved to the large sports complex Dynamo-Sportforum in Alt-Hohenschönhausen. The team played in the ice hockey facility of the Sportforum Hohenschönhausen until the 2007–08 season. The corrugated tin roof of the ice hockey facility gave rise to its  popular name "Wellblechpalast". The capacity of the facility is 4,695 spectators.  

Eisbären Berlin moved its home matches to the new Mercedes-Benz Arena (formerly known as O2 World) in the 2008–09 season. The Mercedes-Benz-Arena is a multi-functional arena located in Friedrichshain near the Spree river. It has a seating-capacity of 14,200.  The team still uses the Wellblechpalast as a training facility and the youth teams of Eisbären Berlin are based in the Sportforum Hohenschönhausen.

Team anthem
The official team anthem of the Eisbären Berlin is "Hey, wir wollen die Eisbären seh'n" (approximately "Hey, We Want to See The Polar Bears"), recorded by veteran East German band the Puhdys in 1997. The song became a popular tune in German mountain resorts during après-ski parties, and went on to appear on several winter-themed music compilations. Dutch team Geleen Eaters have also used a lyrically-altered cover of the song as their victory anthem.

The Eisbären goal song consists of a sequence of four separate elements. The line "Berlin, Halleluja Berlin", from the song "Brandenburg" by Rainald Grebe is followed by the can-can from Jacques Offenbach's Orpheus in the Underworld and the line "Ach du meine Nase" by the East German puppet character Pittiplatsch. The sequence is completed by the children's rhyme "Ene mene miste" from the popular children's TV programme Rappelkiste.

Honors
 Deutsche Eishockey Liga Championship: 2005, 2006, 2008, 2009, 2011, 2012, 2013, 2021, 2022
 East German Ice Hockey Championship: 1966, 1967, 1968, 1976, 1977, 1978, 1979, 1980, 1982, 1983, 1984, 1985, 1986, 1987, 1988
 European Trophy: 2010
 Deutscher Eishockey-Pokal: 2008
 IIHF Continental Cup: 1998, 2000
 European Hockey League (EHL): 1999

Players

Current roster

Honored members

19 Mark Beaufait
11 Sven Felski
27 Steve Walker
20 Denis Pederson
14 Stefan Ustorf
24 André Rankel

Season-by-season record
Note: GP= Games, W = Win, L = Loss, T = Tie, OTL = Overtime Loss, GF = Goals For, GA = Goals Against

Point System: Win = 2 points, T = 1 point, OTL = 1 point

Note: W = Win, SOW – Shoot-out Win; L = Losses, SOL' – Shoot-out Losses

Point System: As of the 1998/99 season a new point scoring system was introduced: Win = 3 points; OT/SO Win = 2 points, OTL/SOL = 1point

Note: GP = Games,  W = Wins, OTW = Overtime Wins, SOW = Shoot-out Wins, L = Losses, OTL – Overtime Losses, SOL = Shoot-out Losses, GF = Goals For, GA = Goals Against

Point System: Win = 3 points; OT/SO Win = 2 points, OTL/SOL = 1point

Club statistics
Note: this section includes only statistics accumulated between 1990 and the end of the 2011/12 season.

Sponsors
Berliner Rundfunk
Berliner Volksbank
Bito AG
Galeria Kaufhof
Gasag
Hasseröder
Hornbach
Ramada

See also
Sport in Berlin

References

External links

 

Deutsche Eishockey Liga teams
Sport in Berlin
Ice hockey teams in Germany
SC Dynamo Berlin
SV Dynamo
Ice hockey clubs established in 1954
1954 establishments in East Germany